Matti Ritola (1 January 1902, in Haapavesi – 4 May 1967) was a Finnish cross-country skier. He was born in Haapavesi. He participated at the 1924 Winter Olympics in  Chamonix, where he placed 11th in 18 km.

Cross-country skiing results

Olympic Games

World Championships

References

External links

1902 births
1967 deaths
People from Haapavesi
Finnish male cross-country skiers
Olympic cross-country skiers of Finland
Cross-country skiers at the 1924 Winter Olympics
Sportspeople from North Ostrobothnia
20th-century Finnish people